Bharta  is a village development committee in Kalikot district in the Karnali Zone of north-western Nepal. At the time of the 1991 Nepal census it had a population of 4008 people living in 754 individual households.

References

External links
UN map of the municipalities of Kalikot district

Populated places in Kalikot District